Reidar Haaland (21 February 1919 – 17 August 1945) was a police officer and voluntary frontline soldier for the German forces.

He hailed from Stavanger. He was a member of Nasjonal Samling from 6 December 1940, and on 20 June 1941 he joined Den Norske Legion. The legion became defunct in 1943, whereupon Haaland found work in Statspolitiet in Oslo. Already in the autumn of 1943 he was transferred to Gestapo.

Haaland was tried and found guilty of treason, torture, maltreatment and aggravated assault with dangerous tool. He became the first Norwegian to receive the death sentence by the Supreme Court of Norway during the post-World War II trials. Reidar Haaland was executed by firing squad on 17 August 1945 at Akershus Fortress, Oslo.

References

1919 births
1945 deaths
People from Stavanger
Executed Norwegian collaborators with Nazi Germany
Members of Nasjonal Samling
Norwegian police officers